Mesquite Valley is a valley in Clark County, Nevada and Inyo County and San Bernardino County, California. It is bounded on the northeast by the Spring Mountains, by the Mesquite Mountains to the southwest and the Clark Mountains to the southeast.

References

Valleys of Nevada
Valleys of California
Valleys of Clark County, Nevada
Valleys of Inyo County, California
Valleys of San Bernardino County, California